The 2016–17 season was Al-Nassr Football Club's 62nd in existence and 41st consecutive season in Pro League, the top flight of Saudi Arabian football. Along with Pro League, Al-Nassr competed in the Crown Prince Cup and King Cup.

Players

Squad information

Transfers

In

Out

On loan

Pre-season friendlies

Competitions

Overall

Last Updated: 4 May 2017

Pro League

League table

Results summary

Results by round

Matches
All times are local, AST (UTC+3).

Crown Prince Cup

All times are local, AST (UTC+3).

King Cup

Statistics

Squad statistics
As of 4 May 2017.

|}

Goalscorers

Last Updated: 4 May 2017

Clean sheets

Last Updated: 4 May 2017

References

Al Nassr FC seasons
Nassr